Waltz For Lilli (released 2014 in Oslo, Norway by Øra Fonogram – OF034) is the debut solo album by the saxophonist Hanna Paulsberg, as "Hanna Paulsberg Concept".

Reception 
The review by Fredrik Wandrup of the Norwegian newspaper Dagbladet awarded the album 5 stars (dice), and the reviewer Ian Mann of the Jazz Mann awarded the album 4 stars

Review 
The harmonies between the energetic piano by the Swede Oscar Grönberg, and the secure saxophone of Paulsberg, characterize the album. All the compositions are made by Paulsberg, and the music is incessantly in motion, driving dynamics, but carefully lifted by the rhythm section, Hans Hulbækmo (drums) and Trygve Waldemar Fishing (bass).

All About Jazz critique John Kelman, in his review of Paulsberg's album Waltz For Lilli states:

Track listing 
All compositions by Hanna Paulsberg

Recorded in Øra Studio 12–14 January 2012

Personnel 
Hanna Paulsberg - saxophone
Trygve Waldemar Fiske - double bass
Oscar Grönberg - piano
Hans Hulbækmo - drums

Credits 
Cover design – Heida Karine Johannesdottir Mobeck & Leiv Aspèn
Mastering – Jo Ranheim
Mixing – Jostein Ansnes
Photography (cover) – Johannes Selvaag
Photography (inside) – Andreas Hansson

Notes 
Mastered by Jo Ranheim in Redroom studios
Recorded in Øra Studio 12–14 January 2012
Rights Society: n©b

References 

Hanna Paulsberg albums
2012 albums